Perceval Jeffery Thornton Henery (6 June 1859 – 10 August 1938) was an English first-class cricketer active 1879–94 who played for Middlesex. He was born in London; died in Washford.

He was educated at Harrow School for whom he played cricket.

References

1859 births
1938 deaths
People educated at Harrow School
English cricketers
Middlesex cricketers
Cambridge University cricketers
Marylebone Cricket Club cricketers
Gentlemen of England cricketers
West of England cricketers